Arthrobacter methylotrophus is a bacterium species from the genus Arthrobacter which has been isolated from soil around the roots of the plant Tagetes minuta.

References

Further reading

External links
Type strain of Arthrobacter methylotrophus at BacDive -  the Bacterial Diversity Metadatabase

Bacteria described in 2002
Micrococcaceae